Miomantis is a genus of praying mantis in the subfamily Miomantinae.

Species
See List of Miomantis species

See also
List of mantis genera and species

References

 
Mantodea genera
Mantidae
Taxa named by Henri Louis Frédéric de Saussure